Rhodri Henry Hughes (19 June 1891 – 22 February 1970) was a Welsh theatre, film and television actor, who appeared in over 80 films between 1932 and 1961.

Selected filmography

 Mr. Bill the Conqueror (1932)
 Reunion (1932)
 Say It with Flowers (1934) - Sam - Newspaper Seller (uncredited)
 How's Chances? (1934) - (uncredited)
 Music Hall (1934)
 A Glimpse of Paradise (1934) - Walter Fielding
 The Old Curiosity Shop (1934) - Short
 Lest We Forget (1934) - Taffy
 Kentucky Minstrels (1934) - Town Clerk
 Breakers Ahead (1935) - Will
 A Real Bloke (1935) - Taffy
 The Small Man (1935) - David
 Cock o' the North (1935) - Taffy
 Honeymoon for Three (1935) - Toomes
 The River House Mystery (1935) - Higgins
 Cheer Up (1936) - Dick Dirk
 Twelve Good Men (1936)
 Men of Yesterday (1936)
 Make-Up (1937) - Mr. Greenswarter
 Captain's Orders (1937) - Cookie
 Little Miss Somebody (1937)
 Poison Pen (1939) - Handwriting Expert
 The Stars Look Down (1940) - Union Committee Member (uncredited)
 The Proud Valley (1940) - Lloyd - Miner (uncredited)
 Girl in the News (1940) - Doctor (uncredited)
 Charley's (Big-Hearted) Aunt (1940) - Butler (uncredited)
 Under Your Hat (1940) - Film Director
 The Case of the Frightened Lady (1940) - Vicar at Dance (uncredited)
 Saloon Bar (1940) - Doctor Martin
 The Ghost of St. Michael's (1941) - Amberley
 Old Mother Riley in Business (1941)
 Quiet Wedding (1941) - Vicar
 The Saint's Vacation (1941) - Valet (uncredited)
 "Pimpernel" Smith (1941) - Zigor
 Cottage to Let (1941) - German Agent (uncredited)
 Atlantic Ferry (1941) - Minor role (uncredited)
 The Black Sheep of Whitehall (1942) - Journalist (uncredited)
 Hatter's Castle (1942) - Gordon
 Hard Steel (1942) - Coroner
 In Which We Serve (1942) - Photographer
 Meet Sexton Blake (1945) - Ferraby
 Here Comes the Sun (1946) - Simpson
 George in Civvy Street (1946)
 The Life and Adventures of Nicholas Nickleby (1947) - Tim Linkinwater
 Green Fingers (1947) - Mr. Green (uncredited)
 So Well Remembered (1947) - Chief Librarian
 The Silver Darlings (1947) - Shoemaker
 Fame Is the Spur (1947) - Wartime Miners' Spokesman (uncredited)
 Blanche Fury (1948) - Zeremonienmeister (uncredited)
 There Is No Escape (1948) - The Chaplain
 Mr. Perrin and Mr. Traill (1948) - Doctor
 The Small Back Room (1949) - Welsh Doctor
 The Last Days of Dolwyn (1949) - Caradoc
 Poet's Pub (1949) - Truscott (uncredited)
 Obsession (1949) - Clubman
 The Reluctant Widow (1950)
 Old Mother Riley's Jungle Treasure (1950) - Mr. Orders
 The Man in the White Suit (1951) - Green
 Scrooge (1951) - Fezziwig
 Salute the Toff (1952) - Jolly
 Hammer the Toff (1952) - Jolly
 Escape Route (1952) - Porter
 The Great Game (1953) - Mr. Broderick
 Alf's Baby (1953) - Mr. Prendergast
 The Final Test (1953) - Mr. Harborne (uncredited)
 Meet Mr. Lucifer (1953) - Billings
 Trouble in Store (1953) - Taffy (Doorman At Staff Entrance) (uncredited)
 The Million Pound Note (1954) - Clergyman at Bumbles Hotel (uncredited)
 Eight O'Clock Walk (1954) - Minor Role (uncredited)
 John Wesley (1954) - Mr. Bligh
 The Crowded Day (1954) - Chemist
 Mystery on Bird Island (1954) - Grumpy
 One Jump Ahead (1955) - Mac
 See How They Run (1955) - Rev. Arthur Humphrey
 Not So Dusty (1956) - Layton
 Around the World in Eighty Days (1956) - Minor Role (uncredited)
 Sea Wife (1957) - Club Barman
 The Spaniard's Curse (1958) - Jody
 Corridors of Blood (1958) - Man With Watch
 The House in Marsh Road (1960) - Daniels

References

External links
 

1891 births
1970 deaths
Welsh male stage actors
Welsh male film actors
Welsh male television actors
People from Porthmadog
20th-century Welsh male actors